Theorycraft (or theorycrafting) is the mathematical analysis of game mechanics, usually in video games, to discover optimal strategies and tactics. Theorycraft involves analyzing statistics, hidden systems, or underlying game code in order to glean information that is not apparent during normal gameplay.  Theorycraft is similar to analyses performed in sports or other games, such as baseball's sabermetrics. The term has been said to come from StarCraft players as a portmanteau of "game theory" and "StarCraft".

Theorycraft is prominent in multiplayer games, where players attempt to gain competitive advantage by analyzing game systems. As a result, theorycraft can lower barriers between players and game designers. Game designers must consider that players will have a comprehensive understanding of game systems; and players can influence design by exploiting game systems and discovering dominant or unintended strategies.

The way players theorycraft varies from game to game, but often games under the same genres (e.g. collectible card games, MMORPGs, turn-based strategy) will have similar theorycrafting methods. Communities develop standardized ways to communicate their findings, including use of specialized tools to measure and record game data, and terminology and simulations to represent certain data. Theorycrafts proven potent usually find inclusion in the metagame. Knowledge from theorycrafts are often communicated through blogs, community forums, or game guides.

The term theorycraft can be used in a pejorative sense. In this sense, "theorycraft" refers to naïve or impractical theorizing that would not succeed during actual gameplay.

See also
Econometrics

References

Game theory
Video game gameplay